This Is Jayde: The One Hit Wonder is a 2014 British comedy film directed by Mark Noyce, who also wrote and starred alongside and Shaun Williamson. The film follows Jayde, a former 90's popstar desperate for a return to the limelight, that places all his hopes on a TV talent show hosted by Williamson's character Shaun.

Cast
 Mark Noyce as Jayde
 Shaun Williamson as Shaun
 Rebecca Edwards as Daisy Thompson

References

External links
 
 Shaun Williamson interview on British Comedy Guide
 Interview with Mark Noyce in the Digital Filmmaker magazine
 Mark Noyce and Shaun Williamson in the Fenland Citizen

2014 films
British comedy films
2014 comedy films
2010s English-language films
2010s British films